During the 1999–2000 English football season, Mansfield Town Football Club competed in the Football League Third Division where they finished in 17th position with 56 points.

Final league table

Results
Mansfield Town's score comes first

Legend

Football League Third Division

FA Cup

League Cup

Football League Trophy

Squad statistics

References
General
Mansfield Town 1999–2000 at soccerbase.com (use drop down list to select relevant season)

Specific

Mansfield Town F.C. seasons
Mansfield Town